R Leonis is a red giant Mira-type variable star located approximately 370 light years away in the constellation Leo.

The apparent magnitude of R Leonis varies between 4.31 and 11.65 with a period of 312 days. At maximum it can be seen with the naked eye, while at minimum a telescope of at least 7 cm is needed. The star's effective temperature is estimated 2,890 kelvins and radius spans , roughly Mars's orbital zone.

Possible planet

In 2009 Wiesemeyer et al. proposed that quasi-periodic fluctuations observed for the star R Leonis may be due to the presence of an evaporating substellar companion, probably an extrasolar planet. They have inferred a putative mass for the orbiting body of twice the mass of Jupiter, orbital period of 5.2 years and likely orbital separation of 2.7 astronomical units.
If confirmed such a planetary object could likely be an evaporating planet, with a long comet-like trail as hinted by intense SiO maser emissions.

References

External links
 AAVSO Variable Star of the Month. April, 2001: R Leonis 

Leo (constellation)
Mira variables
Leonis, R
Hypothetical planetary systems
084748
3882
M-type giants
048036
Durchmusterung objects
Emission-line stars